B.A.S.I.C. is an album composed by the music group Alpinestars, released in 2000.

Track listing 
All compositions from Thomas and Woolgar except where noted.

 "Jump Jet" – 2:52
 "77 Sunset Strip" – 4:28
 "Hyper Hyper" – 4:31
 "Keep It Coming" – 3:16
 "You Rescue" (Butler, Thomas, Woolgar) – 3:22
 "Interlaken" – 5:40
 "Arianne" – 4:54
 "Green Raven Blonde" – 3:04
 "Cresta La Wave" – 5:09
 "Size 9" – 5:25
 "V.T.O.L." – 1:51
 "Complete Control" – 6:35

Personnel 
 Neil Claxton – mixing
 Glyn Thomas – producer, mixing
 Richard Woolgar – producer, mixing

References 

2000 albums
Alpinestars (band) albums